All Hail the Yeti is an American heavy metal band from Los Angeles.  Formed in 2006, the ensemble has released three studio albums entitled All Hail the Yeti, Screams From a Black Wilderness and Highway Crosses.

History 
On April 8, 2016, the band released Screams from a Black Wilderness, produced by Matt Hyde.  From late July until late August 2016, the band performed on their Haunted & Damaged North American headline tour with American thrash metal band Final Drive.

Critical reception 
Holly Wright of Team Rock describes Screams From a Black Wilderness as "surprisingly upbeat, centring its sound on a heady combo of metalcore and stoner riffs".

Anne Nickoloff of Alternative Press Magazine portrays the songs on Screams From a Black Wilderness as "complete mini stories, making the concept album a compilation of horror tales".

Personnel

Current members 
 Connor Garritty – lead vocals
 Nicholas Diltz – bass, backing vocals
 Ryan "Junior" Kittlitz – drums
 Dave Vanderlinde – guitars

Discography

Studio albums 
All Hail the Yeti (2012)
Screams from a Black Wilderness (2016)
 Highway Crosses (2018)

Extended play albums 
 Within the Hollow Earth (2021)

Singles 
 "Slow Season"
 "Feed the Pigs"

References

External links

Musical groups from Los Angeles
Heavy metal musical groups from California